The Roman Catholic Diocese of Sincelejo is a diocese located in the city of Sincelejo in the Ecclesiastical province of Cartagena in Colombia.

History
 25 April 1969: Established as Diocese of Sincelejo from the Metropolitan Archdiocese of Cartagena

Special churches
Minor Basilicas:
Señor de los Milagros in Sincelejo (Lord of Miracles)

Ordinaries
Félix María Torres Parra (1969.04.25 – 1980.12.11) Appointed, Bishop of Santa Marta
Héctor Jaramillo Duque, S.D.B. (1981.08.03 – 1990.09.16)
Nel Hedye Beltrán Santamaria (1992.04.29 – 2014.03.15)
José Crispiano Clavijo Méndez (2015.02.19 - present)

See also
Roman Catholicism in Colombia

Sources

External links
 Catholic Hierarchy
 GCatholic.org

Roman Catholic dioceses in Colombia
Roman Catholic Ecclesiastical Province of Cartagena
Christian organizations established in 1969
Roman Catholic dioceses and prelatures established in the 20th century